Palle is a given name.  Notable people with the given name include: 

 Palle Christiansen (born 1973), Greenlandic politician
 Palle Huld (1912 – 2010), Danish Boy Scout film actor and writer
 Palle Mikkelborg (born 1941), Danish jazz trumpet player, composer, arranger and record producer
 Palle Sørensen (1927 – 2018), Danish convicted murderer
 Palle Suenson, (1904 - 1987), Danish modernist architect

See also 

 Palle (disambiguation)

Given names